
There are over 1,400 buildings, sites, districts, and objects in Kansas listed on the National Register of Historic Places in Kansas. NRHP listings appear in 101 of the state's 105 counties.

Current listings by county
The following are approximate tallies of current listings by county. These counts are based on entries in the National Register Information Database as of April 24, 2008 and new weekly listings posted since then on the National Register of Historic Places website since that time. There are frequent additions to the listings and occasional delistings and the counts here are approximate and not official. New entries are added to the official Register on a weekly basis.  Also, the counts in this table exclude boundary increase and decrease listings which modify the area covered by an existing property or district and which carry a separate National Register reference number. The numbers of NRHP listings in each county are documented by tables in each of the individual county list-articles.

Allen County

|}

Former listing

|}

Anderson County

|}

Atchison County

Barber County

|}

Barton County

Bourbon County

Brown County

Butler County

Chase County

Chautauqua County

|}

Cherokee County

Cheyenne County

|}

Clark County

|}

Clay County

|}

Cloud County

Coffey County

|}

Comanche County

|}

Cowley County

Crawford County

Decatur County

|}

Dickinson County

Doniphan County

Douglas County

Edwards County

|}

Elk County

|}

Ellis County

Ellsworth County

Finney County

Ford County

Franklin County

Geary County

Gove County

|}

Graham County

|}

Grant County

|}

Gray County

|}

Greeley County

|}

Greenwood County

Hamilton County

|}

Harper County

Harvey County

Haskell County
There are no sites listed on the National Register of Historic Places in Haskell County.

Hodgeman County

|}

Jackson County

|}

Former listing

|}

Jefferson County

|}

Jewell County

|}

Johnson County

Kearny County

|}

Kingman County

Kiowa County

|}

Former listing

|}

Labette County

Lane County

|}

Leavenworth County

Lincoln County

Linn County

Logan County

|}

Lyon County

Marion County

Marshall County

McPherson County

Meade County

|}

Miami County

Mitchell County

Montgomery County

Morris County

Morton County

Nemaha County

Neosho County

Ness County

Norton County

|}

Osage County

Osborne County

Ottawa County

|}

Pawnee County

Phillips County

Pottawatomie County

Pratt County

Rawlins County

|}

Reno County

Republic County

Rice County

Riley County

Rooks County

|}

Former listing

|}

Rush County

|}

Former listing

|}

Russell County

Saline County

Scott County

|}

Sedgwick County

Seward County
There are no sites listed on the National Register of Historic Places in Seward County.

Shawnee County

Sheridan County

|}

Sherman County

|}

Former listing

|}

Smith County

|}

Stafford County

Stanton County
There are no sites listed on the National Register of Historic Places in Stanton County.

Stevens County
There are no sites listed on the National Register of Historic Places in Stevens County.

Sumner County

Thomas County

|}

Former listing

|}

Trego County

Wabaunsee County

Wallace County

|}

Washington County

Wichita County

|}

Wilson County

Woodson County

|}

Wyandotte County

See also
List of National Historic Landmarks in Kansas

References

 
Kansas